Wayq'uqucha (Quechua wayq'u brook; valley, qucha lake, "brook (or valley) lake", also spelled Huaycococha) is a lake in the Andes of Peru. Wayq'uqucha is located in the Ancash Region, Pallasca Province, Conchucos District.

References 

Lakes of Peru
Lakes of Ancash Region